Franklin Merrell-Wolff (born Franklin Fowler Wolff; 11 July 1887 – 4 October 1985) was an American mystic and esoteric philosopher. After formal education in philosophy and mathematics at Stanford and Harvard, Wolff devoted himself to the goal of transcending the normal limits of human consciousness. After exploring various mystical teachings and paths, he dedicated himself to the path of jnana yoga and the writings of Shankara, the expounder of the Advaita Vedanta school of Hindu philosophy.

Life
Franklin Fowler Wolff was born in Pasadena, California in 1887. He was raised as a Methodist, but abandoned Christianity during his youth. Wolff studied mathematics and philosophy at Stanford and Harvard. At Stanford, he was elected to the Phi Beta Kappa Society in 1911. He briefly taught mathematics at Stanford in 1914, but left academia the following year. In 1920, Wolff married Sarah Merrell Briggs. The couple joined their original surnames; hence Wolff became Franklin Merrell-Wolff. Merrell-Wolff and his wife founded an esoteric group called the Assembly of Man in 1928, which congregated in an ashram in the Sierra Nevada mountains near Mount Whitney. Sarah Merrell-Wolff, also known as Sherifa, died in 1959. Franklin Merrell-Wolff remarried and lived the rest of his life in the mountains until his death in 1985. He authored various books and a great number of recorded lectures explaining his philosophy.

Philosophy
Wolff's philosophy was described by religious scholar Arthur Versluis as a "consistent and extensive body of work with a unique vocabulary and set of concepts". In his works, Wolff described his mystic experiences and their implications, examining his experience in the light of his extensive knowledge of mathematics and philosophy. Although he started an Ashram, his form of spirituality was not necessarily compatible with a religious structure.

In his book Pathways Through to Space, Wolff describes having a profound spiritual realization in 1936, which provided the basis for his transcendental philosophy.  He called this experience the "Fundamental Realization". In its aftermath, Wolff found himself being in a state of euphoric consciousness he called the "Current of Ambrosia", which he described as being "above time, space and causality". It also led Wolff to a state of "High Indifference", or consciousness without an object. At the center of these experiences was the realization of "Primordial consciousness", which, according to Wolff, is beyond and prior to the subject or the object and is unaffected by their presence or absence.

One of his fundamental contributions to epistemology was the notion of "Introception", or "Knowledge through Identity". This represents a transcendent form of knowledge which is neither conceptual nor empirical. It is perhaps the simplest and clearest definition ever proposed, of what many mystics have called "Gnosis".

Wolff's other published books detailing his experience and philosophy include The Philosophy of Consciousness Without an Object and Transformations in Consciousness: The Metaphysics and Epistemology (originally published under the title Introceptualism).

Selected works
Merrell-Wolff, Franklin (1973). Pathways Through To Space (New York : Julian Press). .
Merrell-Wolff, Franklin (1973). The Philosophy of Consciousness Without an Object (New York : Julian Press). .
Merrell-Wolff, Franklin (1994). Franklin Merrell-Wolff's Experience and Philosophy: a personal record of transformation and a discussion of transcendental consciousness: containing his Philosophy of Consciousness Without An Object and his Pathways Through To Space (Albany : SUNY Press). 
Merrell-Wolff, Franklin (1995). Transformations in Consciousness: The Metaphysics and Epistemology, edited by Ron Leonard (Albany : SUNY Press). .

See also
 American philosophy
 List of American philosophers

References

Further reading
Leonard, Ron (1999). The Transcendental Philosophy of Franklin Merrell-Wolff (Albany : SUNY Press). .
Leonard, Doroethy B. (2017). Franklin Merrell-Wolff: An American Philosopher and Mystic (Bloomington : Xlibris). .
Vliegenthart, Dave (2018). The Secular Religion of Franklin Merrell-Wolff: An Intellectual History of Anti-Intellectualism in Modern America (Leiden : Brill Publishers) .

External links
 Franklin Merrell-Wolff :: Philosopher. Mathematician. Mystic. Spiritual Teacher.
 The Transcendental Philosophy of Franklin Merrell-Wolff
 The Franklin Merrell-Wolff Fellowship

1887 births
1985 deaths
20th-century American philosophers
American Christian mystics
American spiritual teachers
American spiritual writers
Harvard University alumni
Idealists
Stanford University alumni